Sarah Doudney (15 January 1841, Portsea, Portsmouth, Hampshire – 8 December 1926, Oxford) was an English fiction writer and poet. She is best known for her children's literature and her hymns.

Family and life
Doudney's father ran a candle and soap-making business. One of her uncles was the evangelical clergyman David Alfred Doudney, editor of The Gospel Magazine and Old Jonathan. Doudney was educated at a school for French girls, and started to write poetry and prose as a child. "The Lesson of the Water-Mill", written when she was 15 and published in the Anglican Churchman's Family Magazine (1864), became a well-known song in Britain and the United States. Doudney continued to live with her parents near Catherington until she was 30.

Doudney's first novel, Under Grey Walls, appeared in 1871. Success came with her third, Archie's Old Desk, in 1872. In the 1881 census Doudney described herself as a "Writer for Monthly Journals". She contributed poetry and fiction to periodicals that included Dickens's All the Year Round, the Churchman's Shilling Magazine, the Religious Tract Society's  Girl's Own Paper, The Sunday Magazine, Good Words and The Quiver. By 1891, when she described herself in the census as a novelist, she had written about 35 novels. Most of these were written for young girls, but she also wrote some for adults. Many of them end tragically, but look forward to happiness after death. Anna Cavaye, or, The Ugly Princess tells of a dying child comforted by knowing she has brought other people together.

Doudney's hymns include The Christian's Good Night, set by Ira D. Sankey in 1884 and sung at Charles Spurgeon's funeral.

Sarah's mother Lucy Doudney died in 1891 and her father in 1893. Sarah Doudney then moved to Oxford, where she died in December 1926.

Selected works

The Angels of Christmas, 1870
Harvest Hymn, 1870
Psalms of Life, 1871. A collection of 60 hymns.
Under Gray Walls, 1871
Faith Harrowby: Or the Smugglers' Cave, 1871
Archie's Old Desk, 1872
Self-pleasing. A New Year's Address to Senior Scholars, 1872
The Beautiful Island, and Other Stories (the other stories by other authors), 1872
Loser and Gainer, 1873
Janet Darney. A Tale of Fisher-life in Thale Bay, 1873
Wave upon Wave, 1873
Marion's Three Crowns, 1873
The Cottage in the Woods, and other tales, 1874
Miss Irving's Bible, 1875Oliver's Oath, and How He Kept It, 1875The Great Salterns, 1875Nothing But Leaves, 1875The Pilot's Daughters, 1875Brave Seth, 1877Stories of Girlhood, or the Brook and the River, 1877Monksbury College: A Tale of Schoolgirl Life, 1878Faith's Revenge, 1879The Scarlet Satin Petticoat, 1879While It Is Day. A New Year's Address to Senior Scholars, 1879A Story of Crossport, and Other Stories, 1879Old Anthony's Secret, and Other Stories, 1879Stepping Stones, a Story of our Inner Life, 1880Strangers Yet. A Story, 1880A Child of the Precinct, 1880Stepping-Stones: A Story of Our Inner Life, 1880Anna Cavaye; or, the Ugly Princess, 1882Michaelmas Daisy. A Young Girl's Story, 1882What's in a Name?, 1883Miss Stepney's Fortune, 1883Nelly Channell, 1883A Woman's Glory, 1883The Strength of Her Youth, 1884A Long Lane with a Turning, 1884When We Two Parted. A Tale, c. 1884Prudence Winterburn, 1885Who Is the Enemy? and How He Was Discovered. A tale, 1886When We Were Girls Together, 1886The Missing Rubies, 1887A Son of the Morning, 1887Thy Heart's Desire. A Story of Girls' Lives, 1888Miss Willowburn's Offer, 1888The Vicar of Redcross; Or, Till Death Us Do Part, 1888Under False Colours, 1889Where the Dew Falls in London. A Story of a Sanctuary, 1889Christmas Angels (in verse), 1890The Family Difficulty: The Story of a Young Samaritan, 1891Godiva Durleigh, 1891Where Two Ways Meet, etc., 1891Drifting Leaves (poems), 1892My Message (poem), 1892Voices in the Starlight (poem), 1892The Love-Dream of Gatty Fenning. A Tale, 1892Through Pain to Peace, 1892A Romance Of Lincoln's Inn, 1893Violets for Faithfulness (verse), 1893Louie's Married Life, 1894Katherine's Keys. A Tale, 1896A Vanished Hand, 1896Bitter and Sweet. A Story, 1896Pilgrims of the Night, 1897
, Girl's Own Paper, XX, 1898Lady Dye's Reparation, 1901Silent Strings, 1904One of the Few, 1904A Cluster of Roses, 1906Shadow and Shine, 1906When My Ship Comes Home, 1906Thistle-DownMy Wish for Thee (single poem)The Lesson of the Water Mill'' (with Bond Andrews)

See also
English women hymnwriters (18th–19th centuries)

Eliza Sibbald Alderson
Augusta Amherst Austen
Sarah Bache
Charlotte Alington Barnard
Charlotte Elliott
Ada R. Habershon
Katherine Hankey
Frances Ridley Havergal
Maria Grace Saffery
Anne Steele
Emily Taylor
Emily H. Woodmansee

References

External links

 

Biography at the Cyber Hymnal

1841 births
1926 deaths
English children's writers
English hymnwriters
British women hymnwriters
19th-century English writers
Victorian novelists
Victorian women writers
20th-century English novelists
20th-century English women writers
English women novelists
19th-century English women writers
Women religious writers
Anglican writers
Writers from Portsmouth
Writers from Oxford
People from Catherington